The Killers, released in the UK as Ernest Hemingway's "The Killers", is a 1964 American neo noir crime film. Written by Gene L. Coon and directed by Don Siegel, it is the second Hollywood adaptation of Ernest Hemingway's 1927 short story of the same name, following the 1946 version.

The film stars Lee Marvin, John Cassavetes, Angie Dickinson, and Ronald Reagan.

At the time of release, Marvin said that it was his favorite film. The supporting cast features Clu Gulager, Claude Akins, and Norman Fell. In July 2018, it was selected to be screened in the Venice Classics section at the 75th Venice International Film Festival.

It was Ronald Reagan's final film role before retiring from acting in 1966.

Plot
Hitmen Charlie and Lee enter a school for the blind and shoot the unresistant Johnny North multiple times, killing him. Charlie is bothered that North refused to flee and notes they were paid an unusually high fee. He and Lee run through what they know about Johnny. He was once a champion race car driver whose career ended in a violent crash. Four years before his death, he was involved in a million-dollar robbery of a mail truck. Tempted by the missing money, Charlie and Lee visit Miami to interview Johnny's former mechanic, Earl Sylvester.

Earl tells them (in a flashback) Johnny was at the top of his profession when he met Sheila Farr. Johnny fell in love and planned to propose marriage. However, Johnny's career ended with a fiery crash. At the hospital, Earl revealed to Johnny that Sheila was the mistress of mob boss Jack Browning. Enraged, Johnny rebuffed Sheila's attempts to explain and cut his ties to her.

Charlie and Lee approach a former member of Browning's crew, who reveals (in a flashback) after the crash, Sheila found Johnny working as a mechanic. She told him Browning was planning the robbery of a U.S. postal truck. On Sheila's recommendation, he agreed to Johnny as his getaway driver. Johnny forgave Sheila and modified the getaway car. Johnny punched Browning and threatened to kill him after Browning slapped Sheila. They agreed to "settle this" after the robbery.

Browning and North placed a detour sign to send the mail truck onto an isolated mountain road. When the truck stopped, the gang held it up at gunpoint, loading more than $1 million into the getaway car. Johnny then forced Browning out of the moving car, driving off alone with the money.

Charlie and Lee pay a visit to Browning, who is now a real estate developer in Los Angeles. Browning insists he has no idea what happened to the money. He reveals that Sheila is staying at a hotel and arranges a meeting with her. To avoid an ambush, Charlie and Lee go to the hotel hours earlier than agreed, but a clerk spots them and calls Browning. At first, Sheila denies all knowledge of Johnny or the money. Charlie and Lee beat her and dangle her out the window. Terrified, she tells them the truth (in a flashback).

The night before the robbery, Sheila told Johnny that Browning was planning to kill him and pocket his share. Johnny wanted to kill Browning on the spot. Sheila insisted she had a better idea. On her advice, Johnny threw Browning out of the car and drove the money to Sheila, who double-crosses Johnny. As they entered a motel room, Browning was waiting. He shot Johnny, severely wounding him, before Johnny escaped. Fearing Johnny would seek revenge, Browning hired Charlie and Lee to murder him.

Browning is waiting outside the hotel with a sniper rifle. He kills Lee and wounds Charlie. Browning and Sheila return home, where they prepare to flee with the money. Charlie shows up and shoots Browning dead. He shoots and kills Sheila and staggers out the door with the money. Charlie falls dead on the lawn while spilling the money out of the suitcase as the police arrive.

Cast
 Lee Marvin as Charlie Strom, a professional killer
 Angie Dickinson as Sheila Farr, Johnny's two-timing lover
 Clu Gulager as Lee, a professional killer, Charlie's accomplice
 John Cassavetes as Johnny North, the man Charlie and Lee are hired to kill
 Ronald Reagan as Jack Browning, a gangster, posing as a legitimate businessman
 Claude Akins as Earl Sylvester, mechanic and best friend to Johnny
 Norman Fell as Mickey Farmer, gang member and associate of Browning
 Virginia Christine as Miss Watson, the blind secretary
 Don Haggerty as Mail Truck Driver
 Robert Phillips as George Fleming, gang member and associate of Browning
 Kathleen O'Malley as Miss Leslie, the receptionist
 Burt Mustin as Elderly Man

Production
The Killers was intended to be one of the early made-for-TV movies as part of a Project 120 series of films that did not reach the airwaves. It was filmed under the title Johnny North, but NBC cited it too violent for broadcast; Universal released the film theatrically instead.

Steve McQueen and George Peppard were considered for the role that eventually went to Cassavetes. After Cassavetes was signed to play the race car driver, director Don Siegel found out the actor could barely drive.

Siegel originally was hired as director of the 1946 version, but had been fired.

The Killers was Reagan's last acting role in motion pictures before entering politics and the only villainous role in his career. According to Kirk Douglas's autobiography The Ragman's Son, Reagan regretted doing the movie, particularly because of a scene in which he slaps Dickinson.

The main title and closing music, originally composed by Henry Mancini for the Orson Welles film Touch of Evil (1958), was drawn from the Universal Pictures music library and re-edited for use in this film. The song "Too Little Time", composed by Mancini with lyrics by Don Raye as the love theme for The Glenn Miller Story, was sung by Nancy Wilson.

Reception
The Killers holds a rating of 80% on review aggregator Rotten Tomatoes based on 25 reviews with a 7.2/10 average. The consensus reads: "Though it can't best Robert Siodmak's classic 1946 version, Don Siegel's take on the Ernest Hemingway story stakes out its own violent territory, and offers a terrifically tough turn from Lee Marvin."

Awards
Marvin received the 1965 BAFTA Award for Best Actor for this role as well as for his role in Cat Ballou.

See also
 The Killers (1946 film)
 List of American films of 1964
 Ronald Reagan filmography

References

External links
 
 
 
 
 The Killers essay by Geoffrey O'Brien at The Criterion Collection

1964 films
1960s crime thriller films
American auto racing films
American crime thriller films
Films scored by John Williams
Films about contract killing
Films based on short fiction
Films based on works by Ernest Hemingway
Films directed by Don Siegel
Films set in Miami
Films set in Los Angeles
Universal Pictures films
1960s English-language films
1960s American films